Melaleuca rhaphiophylla, commonly known as swamp paperbark is a plant in the myrtle family, Myrtaceae and is endemic to the south west of Western Australia. It has narrow, needle-like leaves and profuse spikes of white or yellowish flowers at variable times throughout the year. As its common name suggests, it is usually found in salt marshes, or swamps or along watercourses and occurs over wide areas of the south-west.

Description

The flowers are a shade of white to cream, arranged in heads or spikes on the ends of most of the branches which continue to grow after flowering and sometimes also in the upper leaf axils. There are five bundles of stamens around the flower, each with 11 to 25 stamens.

Taxonomy and naming
Melaleuca rhaphiophylla was first formally described in 1844 by Johannes Schauer in Plantae Preissianae from specimens collected "in the sandy plain of the Swan River" and "in humus on the banks of the Avon River near the village of York". The specific epithet (rhaphiophylla) is derived from Ancient Greek words rhaphís meaning  “a needle” and phyllon meaning "a leaf", referring to the needle like foliage of this species.

Distribution and habitat
This melaleuca occurs in and between the Kalbarri and Albany districts. It grows in sandy or clay soils, sometimes with limestone, near watercourses, in swamps and saltmarshes.

Ecology
Melaleuca rhaphiophylla provides food for a range of native animals and because of its dense crown, habitat for fauna. Waterbirds use this species as it often grows in areas that are flooded during the breeding season, deterring many predators. Its shallow roots reduce erosion along watercourses, stabilise soils and trap sediment. In some areas, this species is suffering from competition with the introduced Typha orientalis which regrows more vigorously after fire.

Conservation
Melaleuca rhaphiophylla is listed as "not threatened" by the Government of Western Australia Department of Parks and Wildlife.

Use in horticulture
This species of melaleuca is a useful shrub for damp locations. It can be used as a screening plant if pruned regularly. Seeds are easily collected from unopened capsules on the plant and grown as tubestock or seeded directly into the soil.

References

rhaphiophylla
Myrtales of Australia
Plants described in 1844
Rosids of Western Australia
Endemic flora of Southwest Australia
Taxa named by Johannes Conrad Schauer